Property Club is an Australian property investment club headquartered in Brisbane. Property Club provides members education on property investment through seminars, workshops, conferences and mentoring, as well as assisting members to source investment properties. Property Club provides members with a support network of experienced property investors to help them create a property investment portfolio.

History
Founded as the Investors Club in 1994 by Kevin Young and Kathy Young.  Founder Kevin Young was a major property investors in Australian, having claimed to have bought and sold over 644 properties. Kevin is the author of the book Property, Prosper, Retire and has featured in an episode of Property Investory.

The name was later changed to the Property Club in 2014. The club currently has over 80,000 members and has assisted members in purchasing over 20,000 investment properties.

Member Support 
Property Club assists members with support, advice and at times financial aid when things go wrong, as with members Henry and Maree Schneider when they encountered an unscrupulous builder.

Divisions 
Property Club has several divisions including:
 Property Millionaires Club for members with more than $1 million AUD in their portfolios.
 Young Investors Club focusing on assisting younger real estate investors. and 
 Club Cares a registered Australian charity where Property Club members have raised and donated over $2.1M to help people in need, including a $1M donation to the Australian Red Cross to open the Young Centre in Brisbane.

References 

Real estate companies of Australia